Armenia, officially the Republic of Armenia, is a landlocked country in the Armenian Highlands of Western Asia. It is a part of the Caucasus region and is bordered by Turkey to the west, Georgia to the north, the Lachin corridor (under a Russian peacekeeping force) and Azerbaijan to the east, and Iran and the Azerbaijani exclave of Nakhchivan to the south. Yerevan is the capital, largest city and financial center.

Armenia is a unitary, multi-party, democratic nation-state with an ancient cultural heritage. The first Armenian state of Urartu was established in 860 BC, and by the 6th century BC it was replaced by the Satrapy of Armenia. The Kingdom of Armenia reached its height under Tigranes the Great in the 1st century BC and in the year 301 became the first state in the world to adopt Christianity as its official religion. The ancient Armenian kingdom was split between the Byzantine and Sasanian Empires around the early 5th century. Under the Bagratuni dynasty, the Bagratid Kingdom of Armenia was restored in the 9th century. Declining due to the wars against the Byzantines, the kingdom fell in 1045 and Armenia was soon after invaded by the Seljuk Turks. An Armenian principality and later a kingdom Cilician Armenia was located on the coast of the Mediterranean Sea between the 11th and 14th centuries.

Between the 16th and 19th centuries, the traditional Armenian homeland composed of Eastern Armenia and Western Armenia came under the rule of the Ottoman and Persian empires, repeatedly ruled by either of the two over the centuries. By the 19th century, Eastern Armenia had been conquered by the Russian Empire, while most of the western parts of the traditional Armenian homeland remained under Ottoman rule. During World War I, 1.5 million Armenians living in their ancestral lands in the Ottoman Empire were systematically exterminated in the Armenian genocide. In 1918, following the Russian Revolution, all non-Russian countries declared their independence after the Russian Empire ceased to exist, leading to the establishment of the First Republic of Armenia. By 1920, the state was incorporated into the Transcaucasian Socialist Federative Soviet Republic, and in 1922 became a founding member of the Soviet Union. In 1936, the Transcaucasian state was dissolved, transforming its constituent states, including the Armenian Soviet Socialist Republic, into full Union republics. The modern Republic of Armenia became independent in 1991 during the dissolution of the Soviet Union.

Armenia is a developing country and ranks 85th on the Human Development Index (2021). Its economy is primarily based on industrial output and mineral extraction. While Armenia is geographically located in the South Caucasus, it is generally considered geopolitically European. Since Armenia aligns itself in many respects geopolitically with Europe, the country is a member of numerous European organizations including the Council of Europe, the Eastern Partnership, Eurocontrol, the Assembly of European Regions, and the European Bank for Reconstruction and Development. Armenia is also a member of certain regional groups throughout Eurasia, including the Asian Development Bank, the Collective Security Treaty Organization, the Eurasian Economic Union, and the Eurasian Development Bank. Armenia supports the de facto independent Republic of Artsakh (Nagorno-Karabakh), which was proclaimed in 1991 on territory internationally recognized as part of Azerbaijan. Armenia also recognises the Armenian Apostolic Church, the world's oldest national church, as the country's primary religious establishment. The unique Armenian alphabet was created by Mesrop Mashtots in 405 AD.

Etymology

The contemporary name  (Hayastan) became popular in the Middle Ages by addition of the Persian suffix -stan (place). However the origins of the name Hayastan trace back to much earlier dates and were first attested in circa 5th century in the works of Agathangelos, Faustus of Byzantium, Ghazar Parpetsi, Koryun, and Sebeos.

The name has traditionally been derived from Hayk, the legendary patriarch of the Armenians and a great-great-grandson of Noah, who, according to the 5th-century AD author Moses of Chorene (Movsis Khorenatsi), defeated the Babylonian king Bel in 2492 BC and established his nation in the Ararat region. The further origin of the name is uncertain. It is also further postulated that the name Hay comes from one of the two confederated, Hittite vassal statesthe Ḫayaša-Azzi (1600–1200 BC).

The exonym Armenia is attested in the Old Persian Behistun Inscription (515 BC) as Armina. Xenophon, a Greek general serving in some of the Persian expeditions, describes many aspects of Armenian village life and hospitality in around 401 BC.

Some scholars have linked the name Armenia with the Early Bronze Age state of Armani (Armanum, Armi) or the Late Bronze Age state of Arme (Shupria). These connections are inconclusive as it is not known what languages were spoken in these kingdoms. Additionally, while it is agreed that Arme was located to the immediate west of Lake Van (probably in the vicinity of Sason, and therefore in the greater Armenia region), the location of the older site of Armani is a matter of debate. Some modern researchers have placed it near modern Samsat, and have suggested it was populated, at least partially, by an early Indo-European-speaking people. It is possible that the name Armenia originates in Armini, Urartian for "inhabitant of Arme" or "Armean country." The Arme tribe of Urartian texts may have been the Urumu, who in the 12th century BC attempted to invade Assyria from the north with their allies the Mushki and the Kaskians. The Urumu apparently settled in the vicinity of Sason, lending their name to the regions of Arme and the nearby lands of Urme and Inner Urumu. Given that this was an exonym, it may have meant "wasteland, dense forest", cf. armutu (wasteland), armaḫḫu (thicket, thick woods), armāniš (tree). The southerners considered the northern forests to be the abode of dangerous beasts.

It has also been speculated that the land of Ermenen (located in or near Minni), mentioned by the Egyptian pharaoh Thutmose III in 1446 BC, could be a reference to Armenia.

According to the histories of both Moses of Chorene and Michael Chamchian, Armenia derives from the name of Aram, a lineal descendant of Hayk. The Table of Nations lists Aram as the son of Shem, to whom the Book of Jubilees attests,  Jubilees 8:21 also apportions the Mountains of Ararat to Shem, which Jubilees 9:5 expounds to be apportioned to Aram.

The historian Flavius Josephus also states in his Antiquities of the Jews,

History

Antiquity

Armenia lies in the highlands surrounding the mountains of Ararat. There is evidence of an early civilisation in Armenia in the Bronze Age and earlier, dating to about 4000 BC. Archaeological surveys in 2010 and 2011 at the Areni-1 cave complex have resulted in the discovery of the world's earliest known leather shoe, skirt, and wine-producing facility.

According to the story of Hayk, the legendary founder of Armenia, around 2107 BC Hayk fought against Belus, the Babylonian God of War, at Çavuştepe along the Engil river to establish the very first Armenian state. Historically, this event coincides with the destruction of Akkad by the Gutian dynasty of Sumer in 2115 BC, a time when Hayk may have left with the "more than 300 members of his household" as told in the legend, and also during the beginning of when a Mesopotamian Dark Age was occurring due to the fall of the Akkadian Empire in 2154 BC which may have acted as a backdrop for the events in the legend making him leave Mesopotamia.

Several Bronze Age cultures and states flourished in the area of Greater Armenia, including the Trialeti-Vanadzor culture, Hayasa-Azzi, and Mitanni (located in southwestern historical Armenia), all of which are believed to have had Indo-European populations. The Nairi confederation and its successor, Urartu, successively established their sovereignty over the Armenian Highlands. Each of the aforementioned nations and confederacies participated in the ethnogenesis of the Armenians. A large cuneiform lapidary inscription found in Yerevan established that the modern capital of Armenia was founded in the summer of 782 BC by King Argishti I. Yerevan is one of the world's oldest continuously inhabited cities.

During the late 6th century BC, the first geographical entity that was called Armenia by neighbouring populations was established under the Orontid Dynasty within the Achaemenid Empire, as part of the latters' territories. The kingdom became fully sovereign from the sphere of influence of the Seleucid Empire in 190 BC under King Artaxias I and begun the rule of the Artaxiad dynasty. Armenia reached its height between 95 and 66 BC under Tigranes the Great, becoming the most powerful kingdom of its time east of the Roman Republic.
In the next centuries, Armenia was in the Persian Empire's sphere of influence during the reign of Tiridates I, the founder of the Arsacid dynasty of Armenia, which itself was a branch of the Parthian Empire. Throughout its history, the kingdom of Armenia enjoyed both periods of independence and periods of autonomy subject to contemporary empires. Its strategic location between two continents has subjected it to invasions by many peoples, including Assyria (under Ashurbanipal, at around 669–627 BC, the boundaries of Assyria reached as far as Armenia and the Caucasus Mountains), Medes, Achaemenid Empire, Greeks, Parthians, Romans, Sasanian Empire, Byzantine Empire, Arabs, Seljuk Empire, Mongols, Ottoman Empire, the successive Safavid, Afsharid, and Qajar dynasties of Iran, and the Russians.

Religion in ancient Armenia was historically related to a set of beliefs that, in Persia, led to the emergence of Zoroastrianism. It particularly focused on the worship of Mithra and also included a pantheon of gods such as Aramazd, Vahagn, Anahit, and Astghik. The country used the solar Armenian calendar, which consisted of 12 months.

Christianity spread into the country as early as AD 40. Tiridates III of Armenia (238–314) made Christianity the state religion in 301, partly, in defiance of the Sasanian Empire, it seems, becoming the first officially Christian state, ten years before the Roman Empire granted Christianity an official toleration under Galerius, and 36 years before Constantine the Great was baptised. Prior to this, during the latter part of the Parthian period, Armenia was a predominantly Zoroastrian country.

After the fall of the Kingdom of Armenia in 428, most of Armenia was incorporated as a marzpanate within the Sasanian Empire. Following the Battle of Avarayr in 451, Christian Armenians maintained their religion and Armenia gained autonomy.

Middle Ages

After the Sasanian period (428–636), Armenia emerged as Arminiya, an autonomous principality under the Umayyad Caliphate, reuniting Armenian lands previously taken by the Byzantine Empire as well. The principality was ruled by the Prince of Armenia, and recognised by the Caliph and the Byzantine Emperor. It was part of the administrative division/emirate Arminiya created by the Arabs, which also included parts of Georgia and Caucasian Albania, and had its centre in the Armenian city, Dvin. Arminiya lasted until 884, when it regained its independence from the weakened Abbasid Caliphate under Ashot I of Armenia.

The reemergent Armenian kingdom was ruled by the Bagratuni dynasty and lasted until 1045. In time, several areas of the Bagratid Armenia separated as independent kingdoms and principalities such as the Kingdom of Vaspurakan ruled by the House of Artsruni in the south, Kingdom of Syunik in the east, or Kingdom of Artsakh on the territory of modern Nagorno-Karabakh, while still recognising the supremacy of the Bagratid kings.

In 1045, the Byzantine Empire conquered Bagratid Armenia. Soon, the other Armenian states fell under Byzantine control as well. The Byzantine rule was short-lived, as in 1071 the Seljuk Empire defeated the Byzantines and conquered Armenia at the Battle of Manzikert, establishing the Seljuk Empire. To escape death or servitude at the hands of those who had assassinated his relative, Gagik II of Armenia, King of Ani, an Armenian named Ruben I, Prince of Armenia, went with some of his countrymen into the gorges of the Taurus Mountains and then into Tarsus of Cilicia. The Byzantine governor of the palace gave them shelter where the Armenian Kingdom of Cilicia was eventually established on 6 January 1198 under Leo I, King of Armenia, a descendant of Prince Ruben.

Cilicia was a strong ally of the European Crusaders, and saw itself as a bastion of Christendom in the East. Cilicia's significance in Armenian history and statehood is also attested by the transfer of the seat of the Catholicos of the Armenian Apostolic Church, the spiritual leader of the Armenian people, to the region.

The Seljuk Empire soon started to collapse. In the early 12th century, Armenian princes of the Zakarid family drove out the Seljuk Turks and established a semi-independent principality in northern and eastern Armenia known as Zakarid Armenia, which lasted under the patronage of the Georgian Kingdom. The Orbelian Dynasty shared control with the Zakarids in various parts of the country, especially in Syunik and Vayots Dzor, while the House of Hasan-Jalalyan controlled provinces of Artsakh and Utik as the Kingdom of Artsakh.

Early Modern era

During the 1230s, the Mongol Empire conquered Zakarid Armenia and then the remainder of Armenia. The Mongolian invasions were soon followed by those of other Central Asian tribes, such as the Kara Koyunlu, Timurid dynasty and Ağ Qoyunlu, which continued from the 13th century until the 15th century. After incessant invasions, each bringing destruction to the country, with time Armenia became weakened.

In the 16th century, the Ottoman Empire and the Safavid dynasty of Iran divided Armenia. From the early 16th century, both Western Armenia and Eastern Armenia fell to the Safavid Empire. Owing to the century long Turco-Iranian geopolitical rivalry that would last in Western Asia, significant parts of the region were frequently fought over between the two rivalling empires during the Ottoman–Persian Wars. From the mid 16th century with the Peace of Amasya, and decisively from the first half of the 17th century with the Treaty of Zuhab until the first half of the 19th century, Eastern Armenia was ruled by the successive Safavid, Afsharid and Qajar empires, while Western Armenia remained under Ottoman rule.

From 1604, Abbas I of Iran implemented a "scorched earth" policy in the region to protect his north-western frontier against any invading Ottoman forces, a policy that involved a forced resettlement of masses of Armenians outside of their homelands.

In the 1813 Treaty of Gulistan and the 1828 Treaty of Turkmenchay, following the Russo-Persian War (1804–13) and the Russo-Persian War (1826–28), respectively, the Qajar dynasty of Iran was forced to irrevocably cede Eastern Armenia, consisting of the Erivan and Karabakh Khanates, to Imperial Russia. This period is known as Russian Armenia.

While Western Armenia still remained under Ottoman rule, the Armenians were granted considerable autonomy within their own enclaves and lived in relative harmony with other groups in the empire (including the ruling Turks). However, as Christians under a strict Muslim social structure, Armenians faced pervasive discrimination. When they began pushing for more rights within the Ottoman Empire, Sultan Abdul Hamid II, in response, organised state-sponsored massacres against the Armenians between 1894 and 1896, resulting in an estimated death toll of 80,000 to 300,000 people. The Hamidian massacres, as they came to be known, gave Hamid international infamy as the "Red Sultan" or "Bloody Sultan".

During the 1890s, the Armenian Revolutionary Federation, commonly known as Dashnaktsutyun, became active within the Ottoman Empire with the aim of unifying the various small groups in the empire that were advocating for reform and defending Armenian villages from massacres that were widespread in some of the Armenian-populated areas of the empire. Dashnaktsutyun members also formed Armenian fedayi groups that defended Armenian civilians through armed resistance. The Dashnaks also worked for the wider goal of creating a "free, independent and unified" Armenia, although they sometimes set aside this goal in favour of a more realistic approach, such as advocating autonomy.

The Ottoman Empire began to collapse, and in 1908, the Young Turk Revolution overthrew the government of Sultan Hamid. In April 1909, the Adana massacre occurred in the Adana Vilayet of the Ottoman Empire resulting in the deaths of as many as 20,000–30,000 Armenians. The Armenians living in the empire hoped that the Committee of Union and Progress would change their second-class status. The Armenian reform package (1914) was presented as a solution by appointing an inspector general over Armenian issues.

World War I and the Armenian genocide

The outbreak of World War I led to confrontation between the Ottoman Empire and the Russian Empire in the Caucasus and Persian campaigns. The new government in Istanbul began to look on the Armenians with distrust and suspicion because the Imperial Russian Army contained a contingent of Armenian volunteers. On 24 April 1915, Armenian intellectuals were arrested by Ottoman authorities and, with the Tehcir Law (29 May 1915), eventually a large proportion of Armenians living in Anatolia perished in what has become known as the Armenian genocide.

The genocide was implemented in two phases: the wholesale killing of the able-bodied male population through massacre and subjection of army conscripts to forced labour, followed by the deportation of women, children, the elderly and infirm on death marches leading to the Syrian desert. Driven forward by military escorts, the deportees were deprived of food and water and subjected to periodic robbery, rape, and massacre. There was local Armenian resistance in the region, developed against the activities of the Ottoman Empire. The events of 1915 to 1917 are regarded by Armenians and the vast majority of Western historians to have been state-sponsored mass killings, or genocide.

Turkish authorities deny the genocide took place to this day. The Armenian Genocide is acknowledged to have been one of the first modern genocides. According to the research conducted by Arnold J. Toynbee, an estimated 600,000 Armenians died during deportation from 1915 to 1916. This figure, however, accounts for solely the first year of the Genocide and does not take into account those who died or were killed after the report was compiled on 24 May 1916. The International Association of Genocide Scholars places the death toll at "more than a million". The total number of people killed has been most widely estimated at between 1 and 1.5 million.

Armenia and the Armenian diaspora have been campaigning for official recognition of the events as genocide for over 30 years. These events are traditionally commemorated yearly on 24 April, the Armenian Martyr Day, or the Day of the Armenian genocide.

First Republic of Armenia

Although the Russian Caucasus Army of Imperial forces commanded by Nikolai Yudenich and Armenians in volunteer units and Armenian militia led by Andranik Ozanian and Tovmas Nazarbekian succeeded in gaining most of Ottoman Armenia during World War I, their gains were lost with the Bolshevik Revolution of 1917. At the time, Russian-controlled Eastern Armenia, Georgia, and Azerbaijan attempted to bond together in the Transcaucasian Democratic Federative Republic. This federation, however, lasted from only February to May 1918, when all three parties decided to dissolve it. As a result, the Dashnaktsutyun government of Eastern Armenia declared its independence on 28 May as the First Republic of Armenia under the leadership of Aram Manukian.

The First Republic's short-lived independence was fraught with war, territorial disputes, large-scale rebellions, and a mass influx of refugees from Ottoman Armenia, bringing with them disease and starvation. The Entente Powers sought to help the newly founded Armenian state through relief funds and other forms of support.

At the end of the war, the victorious powers sought to divide up the Ottoman Empire. Signed between the Allied and Associated Powers and Ottoman Empire at Sèvres on 10 August 1920, the Treaty of Sèvres promised to maintain the existence of the Armenian republic and to attach the former territories of Ottoman Armenia to it. Because the new borders of Armenia were to be drawn by United States President Woodrow Wilson, Ottoman Armenia was also referred to as "Wilsonian Armenia". In addition, just days prior, on 5 August 1920, Mihran Damadian of the Armenian National Union, the de facto Armenian administration in Cilicia, declared the independence of Cilicia as an Armenian autonomous republic under French protectorate.

There was even consideration of making Armenia a mandate under the protection of the United States. The treaty, however, was rejected by the Turkish National Movement, and never came into effect. The movement used the treaty as the occasion to declare itself the rightful government of Turkey, replacing the monarchy based in Istanbul with a republic based in Ankara.

In 1920, Turkish nationalist forces invaded the fledgling Armenian republic from the east. Turkish forces under the command of Kazım Karabekir captured Armenian territories that Russia had annexed in the aftermath of the 1877–1878 Russo-Turkish War and occupied the old city of Alexandropol (present-day Gyumri). The violent conflict finally concluded with the Treaty of Alexandropol on 2 December 1920. The treaty forced Armenia to disarm most of its military forces, cede all former Ottoman territory granted to it by the Treaty of Sèvres, and to give up all the "Wilsonian Armenia" granted to it at the Sèvres treaty. Simultaneously, the Soviet Eleventh Army, under the command of Grigoriy Ordzhonikidze, invaded Armenia at Karavansarai (present-day Ijevan) on 29 November. By 4 December, Ordzhonikidze's forces entered Yerevan and the short-lived Armenian republic collapsed.

After the fall of the republic, the February Uprising soon took place in 1921, and led to the establishment of the Republic of Mountainous Armenia by Armenian forces under command of Garegin Nzhdeh on 26 April, which fought off both Soviet and Turkish intrusions in the Zangezur region of southern Armenia. After Soviet agreements to include the Syunik Province in Armenia's borders, the rebellion ended and the Red Army took control of the region on 13 July.

Armenian SSR

Armenia was annexed by the Red Army and along with Georgia and Azerbaijan, was incorporated into the Union of Soviet Socialist Republics as part of the Transcaucasian SFSR (TSFSR) on 4 March 1922. With this annexation, the Treaty of Alexandropol was superseded by the Turkish-Soviet Treaty of Kars. In the agreement, Turkey allowed the Soviet Union to assume control over Adjara with the port city of Batumi in return for sovereignty over the cities of Kars, Ardahan, and Iğdır, all of which were part of Russian Armenia.

The TSFSR existed from 1922 to 1936, when it was divided up into three separate entities (Armenian SSR, Azerbaijan SSR, and Georgian SSR). Armenians enjoyed a period of relative stability within USSR in contrast to the turbulent final years of the Ottoman Empire. The situation was difficult for the church, which struggled with secular policies of USSR. After the death of Vladimir Lenin, Joseph Stalin, the general secretary of the Communist Party, gradually established himself as the dictator of the USSR. Stalin's reign was characterized by mass repressions, that cost millions of lives all over the USSR.

Armenia was not the scene of any battles in World War II. An estimated 500,000 Armenians (nearly a third of the population) served in the Red Army during the war, and 175,000 died.

It is claimed that the freedom index in the region had seen an improvement after the death of Joseph Stalin in 1953 and the emergence of Nikita Khrushchev as the new general secretary of the CPSU. Soon, life in Armenia's SSR began to see rapid improvement. The church, which was limited during the secretaryship of Stalin, was revived when Catholicos Vazgen I assumed the duties of his office in 1955. In 1967, a memorial to the victims of the Armenian genocide was built at the Tsitsernakaberd hill above the Hrazdan gorge in Yerevan. This occurred after mass demonstrations took place on the tragic event's fiftieth anniversary in 1965.

During the Gorbachev era of the 1980s, with the reforms of Glasnost and Perestroika, Armenians began to demand better environmental care for their country, opposing the pollution that Soviet-built factories brought. Tensions also developed between Soviet Azerbaijan and its autonomous district of Nagorno-Karabakh, a majority-Armenian region. About 484,000 Armenians lived in Azerbaijan in 1970. The Armenians of Karabakh demanded unification with Soviet Armenia. Peaceful protests in Armenia supporting the Karabakh Armenians were met with anti-Armenian pogroms in Azerbaijan, such as the one in Sumgait, which was followed by anti-Azerbaijani violence in Armenia. Compounding Armenia's problems was a devastating earthquake in 1988 with a moment magnitude of 7.2.

Gorbachev's inability to alleviate any of Armenia's problems created disillusionment among the Armenians and fed a growing hunger for independence. In May 1990, the New Armenian Army (NAA) was established, serving as a defence force separate from the Soviet Red Army. Clashes soon broke out between the NAA and Soviet Internal Security Forces (MVD) troops based in Yerevan when Armenians decided to commemorate the establishment of the 1918 First Republic of Armenia. The violence resulted in the deaths of five Armenians killed in a shootout with the MVD at the railway station. Witnesses there claimed that the MVD used excessive force and that they had instigated the fighting.

Further firefights between Armenian militiamen and Soviet troops occurred in Sovetashen, near the capital and resulted in the deaths of over 26 people, mostly Armenians. The pogrom of Armenians in Baku in January 1990 forced almost all of the 200,000 Armenians in the Azerbaijani capital Baku to flee to Armenia. On 23 August 1990, Armenia declared its sovereignty on its territory. On 17 March 1991, Armenia, along with the Baltic states, Georgia and Moldova, boycotted a nationwide referendum in which 78% of all voters voted for the retention of the Soviet Union in a reformed form.

Restoration of independence

On 21 September 1991, Armenia officially declared its statehood after the failed August coup in Moscow, RSFSR. Levon Ter-Petrosyan was popularly elected the first President of the newly independent Republic of Armenia on 16 October 1991. He had risen to prominence by leading the Karabakh movement for the unification of the Armenian-populated Nagorno-Karabakh. On 26 December 1991, the Soviet Union ceased to exist and Armenia's independence was recognised.

Ter-Petrosyan led Armenia alongside Defense Minister Vazgen Sargsyan through the First Nagorno-Karabakh War with neighbouring Azerbaijan. The initial post-Soviet years were marred by economic difficulties, which had their roots early in the Karabakh conflict when the Azerbaijani Popular Front managed to pressure the Azerbaijan SSR to instigate a railway and air blockade against Armenia. This move effectively debilitated Armenia's economy as 85% of its cargo and goods arrived through rail traffic. In 1993, Turkey joined the blockade against Armenia in support of Azerbaijan.

The Karabakh war ended after a Russian-brokered ceasefire was put in place in 1994. The war was a success for the Karabakh Armenian forces who managed to capture 16% of Azerbaijan's internationally recognised territory including almost all of the Nagorno-Karabakh itself. The Armenian backed forces remained in control of practically all of that territory until 2020. The economies of both Armenia and Azerbaijan have been hurt in the absence of a complete resolution and Armenia's borders with Turkey and Azerbaijan remain closed. By the time both Azerbaijan and Armenia had finally agreed to a ceasefire in 1994, an estimated 30,000 people had been killed and over a million had been displaced. Several thousand were killed in the later 2020 Karabakh war.

Modernity
In the 21st century, Armenia faces many hardships. It has made a full switch to a market economy. One study ranks it the 41st most "economically free" nation in the world, . Its relations with Europe, the Arab League, and the Commonwealth of Independent States have allowed Armenia to increase trade. Gas, oil, and other supplies come through two vital routes: Iran and Georgia. , Armenia maintained cordial relations with both countries.

The 2018 Armenian Revolution was a series of anti-government protests in Armenia from April to May 2018 staged by various political and civil groups led by a member of the Armenian parliament — Nikol Pashinyan (head of the Civil Contract party). Protests and marches took place initially in response to Serzh Sargsyan's third consecutive term as President of Armenia and later against the Republican Party controlled government in general. Pashinyan declared it a "velvet revolution."

In March 2018, Armenian parliament elected Armen Sarkissian as the new President of Armenia. The controversial constitutional reform to reduce presidential power was implemented, while the authority of the prime minister was strengthened. In May 2018, parliament elected opposition leader Nikol Pashinyan as the new prime minister. His predecessor Serzh Sargsyan resigned two weeks earlier following widespread anti-government demonstrations.

On 27 September 2020, a full-scale war erupted due to the unresolved Nagorno-Karabakh conflict. Both the armed forces of Armenia and Azerbaijan reported military and civilian casualties. The Nagorno-Karabakh ceasefire agreement to end the six-week war between Armenia and Azerbaijan was seen by many as Armenia's defeat and capitulation. The year-long March of Dignity protests forced early elections.

On 20 June 2021, Pashinyan's Civil Contract party won an early parliamentary election. Acting Prime Minister Nikol Pashinyan was officially appointed to the post of prime minister by Armenia's President Armen Sarkissian. In January 2022, Armenian President Armen Sarkissian resigned from office, stating that the constitution no longer gives the president sufficient powers or influence. On 3 March 2022, Vahagn Khachaturyan was elected as the fifth president of Armenia in the second round of parliamentary vote. The next month yet more protests broke out.

Geography

Armenia is a landlocked country in the geopolitical Transcaucasus (South Caucasus) region, that is located in the Southern Caucasus Mountains and their lowlands between the Black Sea and Caspian Sea, and northeast of the Armenian Highlands. Located in Western Asia, on the Armenian Highlands, it is bordered by Turkey to the west, Georgia to the north, the Lachin corridor which is a part of Lachin District that is under the control of a Russian peacekeeping force and Azerbaijan proper to the east, and Iran and Azerbaijan's exclave of Nakhchivan to the south. Armenia lies between latitudes 38° and 42° N, and meridians 43° and 47° E. It contains two terrestrial ecoregions: Caucasus mixed forests and Eastern Anatolian montane steppe.

Topography

The terrain is mostly mountainous, with fast flowing rivers, and few forests. Average elevation of the country area is tenth highest in the world and it has 85.9% mountain area, more than Switzerland or Nepal.

Mount Ararat, which was historically part of Armenia, is the highest mountain in the region at 5,137 meters (16,854 feet). Now located in Turkey, but clearly visible from Armenia, it is regarded by the Armenians as a symbol of their land. Because of this, the mountain is present on the Armenian national emblem today.

Climate

The climate in Armenia is markedly highland continental. Summers are hot, dry and sunny, lasting from June to mid-September. However, the low humidity level mitigates the effect of high temperatures. Evening breezes blowing down the mountains provide a welcome refreshing and cooling effect. Springs are short, while autumns are long. Autumns are known for their vibrant and colourful foliage.

Winter sports enthusiasts enjoy skiing down the hills of Tsaghkadzor, located thirty minutes outside Yerevan.

Environment

Armenia ranked 63rd out of 180 countries on Environmental Performance Index (EPI) in 2018. Its rank on subindex Environmental Health (which is weighted at 40% in EPI) is 109, while Armenia's rank on subindex of Ecosystem Vitality (weighted at 60% in EPI) is 27th best in the world. This suggests that main environmental issues in Armenia are with population health, while environment vitality is of lesser concern. Out of sub-subindices contributing to Environmental Health subindex ranking on Air Quality to which population is exposed is particularly unsatisfying.

Waste management in Armenia is underdeveloped, as no waste sorting or recycling takes place at Armenia's 60 landfills. A waste processing plant is scheduled for construction near Hrazdan city, which will allow for closure of 10 waste dumps.

Despite the availability of abundant renewable energy sources in Armenia (especially hydroelectric and wind power) and calls from EU officials to shut down the nuclear power plant at Metsamor, the Armenian Government is exploring the possibilities of installing new small modular nuclear reactors. In 2018 existing nuclear plant is scheduled for modernization to enhance its safety and increase power production by about 10%.

Government and politics

Armenia is a representative parliamentary democratic republic. The Armenian constitution adhered to the model of a semi-presidential republic until April 2018.

According to the current Constitution of Armenia, the President is the head of state holding largely representational functions, while the Prime Minister is the head of government and exercises executive power.

Since 1995 Legislative power is vested in the Azgayin Zhoghov or National Assembly, which is a unicameral parliament consisting of 105 members.

The Fragile States Index since its first report in 2006 until most recent in 2019, consistently ranked Armenia better than all its neighboring countries (with one exception in 2011).

Armenia has universal suffrage above the age of eighteen.

Foreign relations

Armenia became a member of the United Nations on 2 March 1992, and is a signatory to a number of its organizations and other international agreements. Armenia is also a member of international organisations such as the Council of Europe, the Asian Development Bank, the European Bank for Reconstruction and Development, the European Political Community, the Commonwealth of Independent States, the Organization for Security and Cooperation in Europe, the International Monetary Fund, the World Trade Organization, the World Customs Organization, the Organization of the Black Sea Economic Cooperation and La Francophonie. It is a member of the CSTO military alliance, and also participates in NATO's Partnership for Peace program and the Euro-Atlantic Partnership Council. In 2004, its forces joined KFOR, a NATO-led international force in Kosovo. Armenia is also an observer member of the Arab League, the Organization of American States, the Pacific Alliance, the Non-Aligned Movement, and a dialogue partner in the Shanghai Cooperation Organisation. As a result of its historical ties to France, Armenia was selected to host the biennial Francophonie summit in 2018.

Armenia has a difficult relation with neighbouring countries Azerbaijan and Turkey. Tensions were running high between Armenians and Azerbaijanis during the final years of the Soviet Union. The Nagorno-Karabakh conflict dominated the region's politics throughout the 1990s. To this day, Armenia's borders with Turkey and Azerbaijan are under severe blockade. In addition, a permanent solution for the Nagorno-Karabakh conflict has not been reached despite the mediation provided by organizations such as the OSCE.

Turkey also has a long history of poor relations with Armenia over its refusal to acknowledge the Armenian genocide, even though it was one of the first countries to recognize the Republic of Armenia (the third republic) after its independence from the USSR in 1991. Despite this, for most of the 20th century and early 21st century, relations remain tense and there are no formal diplomatic relations between the two countries due to Turkey's refusal to establish them for numerous reasons. During the first Nagorno-Karabakh War, and citing it as the reason, Turkey closed its border with Armenia in 1993. It has not lifted its blockade despite pressure from the powerful Turkish business lobby interested in Armenian markets.

On 10 October 2009, Armenia and Turkey signed protocols on the normalisation of relations, which set a timetable for restoring diplomatic ties and reopening their joint border. The ratification of those had to be made in the national parliaments. In Armenia, before sending the protocols to the parliament, it was sent to the Constitutional Court to have their constitutionality to be approved. The Constitutional Court made references to the preamble of the protocols underlying three main issues. One of them stated that the implementation of the protocols did not imply Armenia's official recognition of the existing Turkish-Armenian border established by the Treaty of Kars. By doing so, the Constitutional Court rejected one of the main premises of the protocols, i.e. "the mutual recognition of the existing border between the two countries as defined by relevant treaties of international law". This was for the Turkish Government the reason to back down from the Protocols. The Armenian President had made multiple public announcements, both in Armenia and abroad, that, as the leader of the political majority of Armenia, he assured the parliamentary ratification of the protocols if Turkey also ratified them. Despite this, the process stopped, as Turkey continuously added more preconditions to its ratification and also "delayed it beyond any reasonable time-period".

Due to its position between two hostile neighbours, Armenia has close security ties with Russia. At the request of the Armenian government, Russia maintains a military base in the city of Gyumri located in Northwestern Armenia as a deterrent against Turkey. Despite this, Armenia has also been looking toward Euro-Atlantic structures in recent years. Armenia maintains positive relations with the United States, which is home to the second largest Armenian diaspora community in the world. According to the US Census Bureau, there are 427,822 Armenian Americans in the country.

Because of the illicit border blockades by Azerbaijan and Turkey, Armenia continues to maintain solid relations with its southern neighbour Iran, especially in the economic sector. Economic projects are being developed between the two nations, including a gas pipeline going from Iran to Armenia.

Armenia is a member of the Council of Europe and maintains close relations with the European Union; especially with its member states France and Greece. In January 2002, the European Parliament noted that Armenia may enter the EU in the future. A 2005 survey reported that 64% of Armenians favored joining the EU, a move multiple Armenian officials have voiced support for.

A former republic of the Soviet Union and an emerging democracy, Armenia was negotiating to become an associate EU partner and had completed negotiations to sign an Association Agreement with a Deep and Comprehensive Free Trade Area with the EU in 2013. However, the government opted not to finalize the agreement, and instead joined the Eurasian Economic Union. Despite this, Armenia and the EU finalized the Armenia-EU Comprehensive and Enhanced Partnership Agreement (CEPA) on 24 November 2017. The agreement enhances the relationship between Armenia and the EU to a new partnership level, further develops cooperation in economic, trade and political areas, aims to improve investment climate, and is designed to bring Armenian law gradually closer to the EU acquis.

Legally speaking, Armenia has the right to be considered as a prospective EU member provided it meets necessary standards and criteria, though officially such a plan does not exist in Brussels. Armenia is included in the EU's European Neighbourhood Policy (ENP) and participates in both the Eastern Partnership and the Euronest Parliamentary Assembly, which aims at bringing the EU and its neighbours closer.

Military

The Armenian Army, Air Force, Air Defence, and Border Guard comprise the four branches of the Armed Forces of Armenia. The Armenian military was formed after the collapse of the Soviet Union in 1991 and with the establishment of the Ministry of Defence in 1992. The Commander-in-Chief of the military is the Prime Minister of Armenia, Nikol Pashinyan. The Ministry of Defence is in charge of political leadership, headed by Davit Tonoyan, while military command remains in the hands of the general staff, headed by the Chief of Staff, who is Lieutenant-General Onik Gasparyan.

Active forces now number about 81,000 soldiers, with an additional reserve of 32,000 troops. Armenian border guards are in charge of patrolling the country's borders with Georgia and Azerbaijan, while Russian troops continue to monitor its borders with Iran and Turkey. In the case of an attack, Armenia is able to mobilize every able-bodied man between the age of 15 and 59, with military preparedness.

The Treaty on Conventional Armed Forces in Europe, which establishes comprehensive limits on key categories of military equipment, was ratified by the Armenian parliament in July 1992. In March 1993, Armenia signed the multilateral Chemical Weapons Convention, which calls for the eventual elimination of chemical weapons. Armenia acceded to the Nuclear Non-Proliferation Treaty (NPT) as a non-nuclear weapons state in July 1993. Armenia is a member of the Collective Security Treaty Organisation (CSTO). Armenia also has an Individual Partnership Action Plan with NATO and it participates in NATO's Partnership for Peace (PiP) program and the Euro-Atlantic Partnership Council (EAPC).

Human rights and freedom

Human rights in Armenia tend to be better than those in most former Soviet republics and have drawn closer to acceptable standards, especially economically. Nonetheless, there are still several considerable problems.

Armenia scored 4.79 on The Economist Intelligence Unit Democracy Index published in January 2019 (data for 2018). Although still classified as "hybrid regime", Armenia recorded the strongest improvement among European countries and reached its ever-best score since calculation began in 2006.

Armenia is classified as "partly free" in the 2019 report (with data from 2018) by Freedom House, which gives it a score of 51 out of 100, which is 6 points ahead of the previous estimate.

Armenia has recorded an unprecedented progress in the 2019 World Press Freedom Index published by Reporters Without Borders, improving its position by 19 points and ranking 61st on the list. The publication also confirms the absence of cases of killed journalists, citizen journalists or media assistants.

Armenia ranks 54th in the 2017 report The Human Freedom Index (with data from 2016) published by Canada's Fraser Institute.

Armenia ranked 29th for economic freedom and 76th for personal freedom among 159 countries in the 2017 Human Freedom Index published by the Cato Institute .

These classifications may improve when data from 2018, including the period of the velvet revolution and thereafter, is analyzed.

Administrative divisions

Armenia is divided into ten provinces (marzer, singular marz), with the city (kaghak) of Yerevan having special administrative status as the country's capital. The chief executive in each of the ten provinces is the marzpet (marz governor), appointed by the government of Armenia. In Yerevan, the chief executive is the mayor, elected since 2009.

Within each province there are communities (hamaynkner, singular hamaynk). Each community is self-governing and consists of one or more settlements (bnakavayrer, singular bnakavayr). Settlements are classified as either towns (kaghakner, singular kaghak) or villages (gyugher, singular gyugh). , Armenia includes 915 communities, of which 49 are considered urban and 866 are considered rural. The capital, Yerevan, also has the status of a community. Additionally, Yerevan is divided into twelve semi-autonomous districts.

† 2011 censusSources: Area and population of provinces.

Economy

The economy relies heavily on investment and support from Armenians abroad. Before independence, Armenia's economy was largely industry-based – chemicals, electronics, machinery, processed food, synthetic rubber, and textile – and highly dependent on outside resources. The republic had developed a modern industrial sector, supplying machine tools, textiles, and other manufactured goods to sister republics in exchange for raw materials and energy.

Agriculture accounted for less than 20% of both net material product and total employment before the dissolution of the Soviet Union in 1991. After independence, the importance of agriculture in the economy increased markedly, its share at the end of the 1990s rising to more than 30% of GDP and more than 40% of total employment. This increase in the importance of agriculture was attributable to food security needs of the population in the face of uncertainty during the first phases of transition and the collapse of the non-agricultural sectors of the economy in the early 1990s. As the economic situation stabilised and growth resumed, the share of agriculture in GDP dropped to slightly over 20% (2006 data), although the share of agriculture in employment remained more than 40%.

Armenian mines produce copper, zinc, gold, and lead. The vast majority of energy is produced with fuel imported from Russia, including gas and nuclear fuel (for its one nuclear power plant); the main domestic energy source is hydroelectric. Small deposits of coal, gas, and petroleum exist but have not yet been developed.

Access to biocapacity in Armenia is lower than world average. In 2016, Armenia had 0.8 global hectares  of biocapacity per person within its territory, much less than the world average of 1.6 global hectares per person. In 2016 Armenia used 1.9 global hectares of biocapacity per person—their ecological footprint of consumption. This means they use double as much biocapacity as Armenia contains. As a result, Armenia is running a biocapacity deficit.

Like other newly independent states of the former Soviet Union, Armenia's economy suffers from the breakdown of former Soviet trading patterns. Soviet investment in and support of Armenian industry has virtually disappeared, so that few major enterprises are still able to function. In addition, the effects of the 1988 Spitak earthquake, which killed more than 25,000 people and made 500,000 homeless, are still being felt. The conflict with Azerbaijan over Nagorno-Karabakh has not been resolved. Shutdown of the nuclear power plant in 1989 lead to the Armenian energy crisis of 1990s. The GDP fell nearly 60% between 1989 and 1993, but then resumed robust growth after the power plant was reopened in 1995. The national currency, the dram, suffered hyperinflation for the first years after its introduction in 1993.

Nevertheless, the government was able to make wide-ranging economic reforms that paid off in dramatically lower inflation and steady growth. The 1994 ceasefire in the Nagorno-Karabakh conflict has also helped the economy. Armenia has had strong economic growth since 1995, building on the turnaround that began the previous year, and inflation has been negligible for the past several years. New sectors, such as precious-stone processing and jewelry making, information and communication technology and tourism are beginning to supplement more traditional sectors of the economy, such as agriculture.

This steady economic progress has earned Armenia increasing support from international institutions. The International Monetary Fund (IMF), World Bank, European Bank for Reconstruction and Development (EBRD), and other international financial institutions (IFIs) and foreign countries are extending considerable grants and loans. Loans to Armenia since 1993 exceed $1.1 billion. These loans are targeted at reducing the budget deficit and stabilising the currency; developing private businesses; energy; agriculture; food processing; transportation; the health and education sectors; and ongoing rehabilitation in the earthquake zone. The government joined the World Trade Organization on 5 February 2003. But one of the main sources of foreign direct investments remains the Armenian diaspora, which finances major parts of the reconstruction of infrastructure and other public projects. Being a growing democratic state, Armenia also hopes to get more financial aid from the Western World.

A liberal foreign investment law was approved in June 1994, and a law on privatization was adopted in 1997, as well as a program of state property privatization. Continued progress will depend on the ability of the government to strengthen its macroeconomic management, including increasing revenue collection, improving the investment climate, and making strides against corruption. However, unemployment, which was 18.5% in 2015, still remains a major problem due to the influx of thousands of refugees from the Karabakh conflict.

In 2017, the economy grew by 7.5% due to rising copper prices.

In 2022, Armenia's GDP stood at $39.4 billion, and enjoyed an economic freedom index of 65.3, according to Heritage Organisation.

The Armenian economy is predicted to grow by 13% in 2022 due to a huge influx of Russian citizens. The IMF's preliminary forecast as of March 2022 predicted growth of 1.5% for the year.

Science, technology and education

Science and technology

Research spending is low in Armenia, averaging 0.25% of GDP over 2010–2013. However, the statistical record of research expenditure is incomplete, as expenditure by privately owned business enterprises is not surveyed in Armenia. The world average for domestic expenditure on research was 1.7% of GDP in 2013.

The country's Strategy for the Development of Science 2011–2020 envisions that 'by 2020, Armenia is a country with a knowledge-based economy and is competitive within the European Research Area with its level of basic and applied research.' It fixes the following targets:
 Creation of a system capable of sustaining the development of science and technology;
 Development of scientific potential, modernization of scientific infrastructure;
 Promotion of basic and applied research;
 Creation of a synergistic system of education, science and innovation; and
 Becoming a prime location for scientific specialization in the European Research Area.
Based on this strategy, the accompanying Action Plan was approved by the government in June 2011. It defines the following targets:
 Improve the management system for science and technology and create the requisite conditions for sustainable development;
 Involve more young, talented people in education and research, while upgrading research infrastructure;
 Create the requisite conditions for the development of an integrated national innovation system; and
 Enhance international co-operation in research and development.

Although the Strategy clearly pursues a 'science push' approach, with public research institutes serving as the key policy target, it nevertheless mentions the goal of establishing an innovation system. However, the main driver of innovation, the business sector, is not mentioned. In between publishing the Strategy and Action Plan, the government issued a resolution in May 2010 on Science and Technology Development Priorities for 2010–2014. These priorities are:
 Armenian studies, humanities and social sciences;
 Life sciences;
 Renewable energy, new energy sources;
 Advanced technologies, information technologies;
 Space, Earth sciences, sustainable use of natural resources; and
 Basic research promoting essential applied research.
The Law on the National Academy of Sciences was adopted in May 2011. This law is expected to play a key role in shaping the Armenian innovation system. It allows the National Academy of Sciences to extend its business activities to the commercialization of research results and the creation of spin-offs; it also makes provision for restructuring the National Academy of Sciences by combining institutes involved in closely related research areas into a single body. Three of these new centres are particularly relevant: the Centre for Biotechnology, the Centre for Zoology and Hydro-ecology and the Centre for Organic and Pharmaceutical Chemistry.

The government is focusing its support on selected industrial sectors. More than 20 projects have been cofunded by the State Committee of Science in targeted branches: pharmaceuticals, medicine and biotechnology, agricultural mechanization and machine building, electronics, engineering, chemistry and, in particular, the sphere of information technology.

Over the past decade, the government has made an effort to encourage science–industry linkages. The Armenian information technology sector has been particularly active: a number of public–private partnerships have been established between companies and universities, in order to give students marketable skills and generate innovative ideas at the interface of science and business. Examples are Synopsys Inc. and the Enterprise Incubator Foundation. Armenia was ranked 69th in the Global Innovation Index in 2021, down from 64th in 2019.

Education

In medieval times, the University of Gladzor and University of Tatev took an important role for Armenian education.

A literacy rate of 100% was reported as early as 1960. In the communist era, Armenian education followed the standard Soviet model of complete state control (from Moscow) of curricula and teaching methods and close integration of education activities with other aspects of society, such as politics, culture, and the economy.

In the 1988–89 school year, 301 students per 10,000 were in specialized secondary or higher education, a figure slightly lower than the Soviet average. In 1989, some 58% of Armenians over age fifteen had completed their secondary education, and 14% had a higher education. In the 1990–91 school year, the estimated 1,307 primary and secondary schools were attended by 608,800 students. Another seventy specialised secondary institutions had 45,900 students, and 68,400 students were enrolled in a total of ten postsecondary institutions that included universities. In addition, 35% of eligible children attended preschools. In 1992 Armenia's largest institution of higher learning, Yerevan State University, had eighteen departments, including ones for social sciences, sciences, and law. Its faculty numbered about 1,300 teachers and its student population about 10,000 students. The National Polytechnic University of Armenia is operating since 1933.

In the early 1990s, Armenia made substantial changes to the centralised and regimented Soviet system. Because at least 98% of students in higher education were Armenian, curricula began to emphasise Armenian history and culture. Armenian became the dominant language of instruction, and many schools that had taught in Russian closed by the end of 1991. Russian was still widely taught, however, as a second language.

In 2014, the National Program for Educational Excellence embarked on creating an internationally competitive and academically rigorous alternative educational program (the Araratian Baccalaureate) for Armenian schools and increasing the importance and status of the teacher's role in society.

The Ministry of Education and Science is responsible for regulation of the sector. Primary and secondary education in Armenia is free, and completion of secondary school is compulsory. Higher education in Armenia is harmonized with the Bologna process and the European Higher Education Area. The Armenian National Academy of Sciences plays an important role in postgraduate education.

Schooling takes 12 years in Armenia and breaks down into primary (4 years), middle (5 years) and high school (3 years). Schools engage a 10-grade mark system. The government also supports Armenian schools outside of Armenia.

Gross enrollment in tertiary education at 44% in 2015 surpassed peer countries of the South Caucasus but remained below the average for Europe and Central Asia. However, public spending per student in tertiary education in GDP-ratio terms is one of the lowest for post-USSR countries (for which data was available).

Demographics

There has been a problem of population decline due to elevated levels of emigration after the break-up of the USSR. In the past years emigration levels have declined and some population growth is observed since 2012.

Armenia has a relatively large external diaspora (8 million by some estimates, greatly exceeding the 3 million population of Armenia itself), with communities existing across the globe. The largest Armenian communities outside of Armenia can be found in Russia, France, Iran, the United States, Georgia, Syria, Lebanon, Australia, Canada, Greece, Cyprus, Israel, Poland, Ukraine and Brazil. 40,000 to 70,000 Armenians still live in Turkey (mostly in and around Istanbul).

About 1,000 Armenians reside in the Armenian Quarter in the Old City of Jerusalem, a remnant of a once-larger community. Italy is home to the San Lazzaro degli Armeni, an island located in the Venetian Lagoon, which is completely occupied by a monastery run by the Mechitarists, an Armenian Catholic congregation. Approximately 139,000 Armenians live in the de facto independent country Republic of Artsakh where they form a majority.

Ethnic groups

Ethnic Armenians make up 98.1% of the population. Yazidis make up 1.2%, and Russians 0.4%. Other minorities include Assyrians, Ukrainians, Greeks (usually called Caucasus Greeks), Kurds, Georgians, Belarusians, and Jews. There are also smaller communities of Vlachs, Mordvins, Ossetians, Udis, and Tats. Minorities of Poles and Caucasus Germans also exist though they are heavily Russified. , there are an estimated 35,000 Yazidis in Armenia.

During the Soviet era, Azerbaijanis were historically the second largest population in the country, numbering 76,550 in 1922, and forming about 2.5% in 1989. However, due to the conflict over Nagorno-Karabakh, virtually all of them emigrated from Armenia to Azerbaijan. Conversely, Armenia received a large influx of Armenian refugees from Azerbaijan, thus giving Armenia a more homogeneous character.

According to Gallup research conducted in 2017 Armenia has one of the highest migrant acceptance (welcoming) rates in eastern Europe.

Languages

Armenians have their own distinct alphabet and language, which is the only official language. The alphabet was invented  by Mesrop Mashtots and consists of thirty-nine letters, three of which were added during the Cilician period. The main foreign languages that Armenians know are Russian and English. Due to its Soviet past, most of the old population can speak Russian quite well. According to a 2013 survey, 95% of Armenians said they had some knowledge of Russian (24% advanced, 59% intermediate) compared to 40% who said they knew some English (4% advanced, 16% intermediate and 20% beginner). However, more adults (50%) think that English should be taught in public secondary schools than those who prefer Russian (44%).

Cities

Religion

Armenia was the first nation to adopt Christianity as a state religion, an event traditionally dated to AD 301.

The predominant religion in Armenia is Christianity. Its roots go back to the 1st century AD, when it was founded by two of Jesus' twelve apostles – Thaddaeus and Bartholomew – who preached Christianity in Armenia between AD 40–60.

Over 93% of Christians in Armenia belong to the Armenian Apostolic Church, which is in communion only with the churches comprising Oriental Orthodoxy—of which it is itself a member.

Catholics also exist in Armenia, both Latin rite and Armenian rite. The latter group, the Armenian Catholic Church, is headquartered in Bzoummar, Lebanon. Of note are the Mechitarists (also spelled "Mekhitarists" ), a congregation of Benedictine monks in the Armenian Catholic Church, founded in 1712 by Mekhitar of Sebaste. They are best known for their series of scholarly publications of ancient Armenian versions of otherwise lost ancient Greek texts.

The Armenian Evangelical Church has several thousand members throughout the country.

Other Christian denominations in Armenia are the Pentecostal branches of Protestant community such as the Word of Life, the Armenian Brotherhood Church, the Baptists (which are known as one of the oldest existing denominations in Armenia, and were permitted by the authorities of the Soviet Union), and Presbyterians.

Armenia is also home to a Russian community of Molokans which practice a form of Spiritual Christianity originated from the Russian Orthodox Church.

The Yazidis, who live in the western part of the country, practice Yazidism. The world's largest Yazidi temple, Quba Mêrê Dîwanê, was completed in 2019 in the village of Aknalich. There are also Kurds who practice Sunni Islam.

There is a Jewish community in Armenia diminished to 750 persons since independence with most emigrants leaving for Israel. There are currently two synagogues in Armenia – in the capital, Yerevan, and in the city of Sevan located near Lake Sevan.

Health care

Healthcare in Armenia has undergone significant changes since independence in 1991. Initially, the Soviet healthcare system was highly centralized and provided free medical assistance to all citizens. After independence, the healthcare system underwent reform and primary care services have been free of charge since 2006. Despite improvements in accessibility and the implementation of an Open Enrollment program, out-of-pocket health expenditures remain high and corruption among healthcare professionals remains a concern. In 2019, healthcare became free for all citizens under the age of 18 and the number of people receiving free or subsidized care under the Basic Benefits Package was increased.

After a significant decline in earlier decades, crude birth rates in Armenia slightly increased from 13.0 (per 1000 people) in the year 1998 to 14.2 in 2015; this timeframe also showed a similar trajectory in the crude death rate, which grew from 8.6 to 9.3. Life expectancy at birth at 74.8 years was the 4th-highest among the Post-Soviet states in 2014.

Culture

Music and dance

Armenian music is a mix of indigenous folk music, perhaps best-represented by Djivan Gasparyan's well-known duduk music, as well as light pop, and extensive Christian music.

Instruments like the duduk, dhol, zurna, and kanun are commonly found in Armenian folk music. Artists such as Sayat Nova are famous due to their influence in the development of Armenian folk music. One of the oldest types of Armenian music is the Armenian chant which is the most common kind of religious music in Armenia. Many of these chants are ancient in origin, extending to pre-Christian times, while others are relatively modern, including several composed by Saint Mesrop Mashtots, the inventor of the Armenian alphabet. Whilst under Soviet rule, the Armenian classical music composer Aram Khatchaturian became internationally well known for his music, for various ballets and the Sabre Dance from his composition for the ballet Gayane.

The Armenian Genocide caused widespread emigration that led to the settlement of Armenians in various countries in the world. Armenians kept to their traditions and certain diasporans rose to fame with their music. In the post-genocide Armenian community of the United States, the so-called "kef" style Armenian dance music, using Armenian and Middle Eastern folk instruments (often electrified/amplified) and some western instruments, was popular. This style preserved the folk songs and dances of Western Armenia, and many artists also played the contemporary popular songs of Turkey and other Middle Eastern countries from which the Armenians emigrated.

Richard Hagopian is perhaps the most famous artist of the traditional "kef" style and the Vosbikian Band was notable in the 1940s and 1950s for developing their own style of "kef music" heavily influenced by the popular American Big Band Jazz of the time. Later, stemming from the Middle Eastern Armenian diaspora and influenced by Continental European (especially French) pop music, the Armenian pop music genre grew to fame in the 1960s and 1970s with artists such as Adiss Harmandian and Harout Pamboukjian performing to the Armenian diaspora and Armenia; also with artists such as Sirusho, performing pop music combined with Armenian folk music in today's entertainment industry.

Other Armenian diasporans that rose to fame in classical or international music circles are world-renowned French-Armenian singer and composer Charles Aznavour, pianist Sahan Arzruni, prominent opera sopranos such as Hasmik Papian and more recently Isabel Bayrakdarian and Anna Kasyan. Certain Armenians settled to sing non-Armenian tunes such as the heavy metal band System of a Down (which nonetheless often incorporates traditional Armenian instrumentals and styling into their songs) or pop star Cher. In the Armenian diaspora, Armenian revolutionary songs are popular with the youth. These songs encourage Armenian patriotism and are generally about Armenian history and national heroes.

Art

Yerevan Vernissage (arts and crafts market), close to Republic Square, bustles with hundreds of vendors selling a variety of crafts on weekends and Wednesdays (though the selection is much reduced mid-week). The market offers woodcarving, antiques, fine lace, and the hand-knotted wool carpets and kilims that are a Caucasus speciality. Obsidian, which is found locally, is crafted into assortment of jewellery and ornamental objects. Armenian gold smithery enjoys a long tradition, populating one corner of the market with a selection of gold items. Soviet relics and souvenirs of recent Russian manufacture – nesting dolls, watches, enamel boxes and so on – are also available at the Vernisage.

Across from the Opera House, a popular art market fills another city park on the weekends. Armenia's long history as a crossroads of the ancient world has resulted in a landscape with innumerable fascinating archaeological sites to explore. Medieval, Iron Age, Bronze Age and even Stone Age sites are all within a few hours drive from the city. All but the most spectacular remain virtually undiscovered, allowing visitors to view churches and fortresses in their original settings.

The National Art Gallery in Yerevan has more than 16,000 works that date back to the Middle Ages, which indicate Armenia's rich tales and stories of the times. It houses paintings by many European masters as well. The Modern Art Museum, the Children's Picture Gallery, and the Martiros Saryan Museum are only a few of the other noteworthy collections of fine art on display in Yerevan. Moreover, many private galleries are in operation, with many more opening every year, featuring rotating exhibitions and sales.

On 13 April 2013, the Armenian government announced a change in law to allow freedom of panorama for 3D works of art.

Cinema

Cinema in Armenia was born on 16 April 1923, when the Armenian State Committee of Cinema was established by a decree of the Soviet Armenian government.

However, the first Armenian film with Armenian subject called "Haykakan Sinema" was produced earlier in 1912 in Cairo by Armenian-Egyptian publisher Vahan Zartarian. The film was premiered in Cairo on 13 March 1913.

In March 1924, the first Armenian film studio; Armenfilm ( "Hayfilm,"  "Armenkino") was established in Yerevan, starting with a documentary film called Soviet Armenia.

Namus was the first Armenian silent black-and-white film, directed by Hamo Beknazarian in 1925, based on a play of Alexander Shirvanzade, describing the ill fate of two lovers, who were engaged by their families to each other since childhood, but because of violations of namus (a tradition of honor), the girl was married by her father to another person. The first sound film, Pepo was shot in 1935 and directed by Hamo Beknazarian.

Sport

A wide array of sports are played in Armenia, the most popular among them being wrestling, weightlifting, judo, association football, chess, and boxing. Armenia's mountainous terrain provides great opportunities for the practice of sports like skiing and climbing. Being a landlocked country, water sports can only be practised on lakes, notably Lake Sevan. Competitively, Armenia has been successful in chess, weightlifting and wrestling at the international level. Armenia is also an active member of the international sports community, with full membership in the Union of European Football Associations (UEFA) and International Ice Hockey Federation (IIHF). It also hosts the Pan-Armenian Games.

Prior to 1992, Armenians would participate in the Olympics representing the USSR. As part of the Soviet Union, Armenia was very successful, winning plenty of medals and helping the USSR win the medal standings at the Olympics on numerous occasions. The first medal won by an Armenian in modern Olympic history was by Hrant Shahinyan (sometimes spelled as Grant Shaginyan), who won two golds and two silvers in gymnastics at the 1952 Summer Olympics in Helsinki. To highlight the level of success of Armenians in the Olympics, Shahinyan was quoted as saying:

"Armenian sportsmen had to outdo their opponents by several notches for the shot at being accepted into any Soviet team. But those difficulties notwithstanding, 90 percent of Armenian athletes on Soviet Olympic teams came back with medals."

Armenia first participated at the 1992 Summer Olympics in Barcelona under a unified CIS team, where it was very successful, winning three golds and one silver in weightlifting, wrestling and sharp shooting, despite only having five athletes. Since the 1994 Winter Olympics in Lillehammer, Armenia has participated as an independent nation.

Armenia participates in the Summer Olympic Games in boxing, wrestling, weightlifting, judo, gymnastics, track and field, diving, swimming and sharp shooting. It also participates in the Winter Olympic Games in alpine skiing, cross-country skiing and figure skating.

Football is also popular in Armenia. The most successful team was the FC Ararat Yerevan team of the 1970s who won the Soviet Cup in 1973 and 1975 and the Soviet Top League in 1973. The latter achievement saw FC Ararat gain entry to the European Cup where – despite a home victory in the second leg – they lost on aggregate at the quarter final stage to eventual winner FC Bayern Munich. Armenia competed internationally as part of the USSR national football team until the Armenian national football team was formed in 1992 after the split of the Soviet Union. Armenia have never qualified for a major tournament although recent improvements saw the team to achieve 44th position in the FIFA World Rankings in September 2011. The national team is controlled by the Football Federation of Armenia. The Armenian Premier League is the highest level football competition in Armenia, and has been dominated by FC Pyunik in recent seasons. The league currently consists of eight teams and relegates to the Armenian First League.

Armenia and the Armenian diaspora have produced many successful footballers, including Henrikh Mkhitaryan, Youri Djorkaeff, Alain Boghossian, Andranik Eskandarian, Andranik Teymourian, Edgar Manucharyan and Nikita Simonyan. Djokaeff and Boghossian won the 1998 FIFA World Cup with France, Teymourian competed in the 2006 World Cup for Iran and Manucharyan played in the Dutch Eredivisie for Ajax. Mkhitaryan has been one of the most successful Armenian footballers in recent years, playing for international clubs such as Borussia Dortmund, Manchester United, Arsenal and currently for A.S. Roma.

Wrestling has been a successful sport in the Olympics for Armenia. At the 1996 Summer Olympics in Atlanta, Armen Nazaryan won the gold in the Men's Greco-Roman Flyweight (52 kg) category and Armen Mkrtchyan won the silver in Men's Freestyle Paperweight (48 kg) category, securing Armenia's first two medals in its Olympic history.

Traditional Armenian wrestling is called Kokh and practised in traditional garb; it was one of the influences included in the Soviet combat sport of Sambo, which is also very popular.

The government of Armenia budgets about $2.8 million annually for sports and gives it to the National Committee of Physical Education and Sports, the body that determines which programs should benefit from the funds.

Due to the lack of success lately on the international level, in recent years, Armenia has rebuilt 16 Soviet-era sports schools and furnished them with new equipment for a total cost of $1.9 million. The rebuilding of the regional schools was financed by the Armenian government. $9.3 million has been invested in the resort town of Tsaghkadzor to improve the winter sports infrastructure because of dismal performances at recent winter sports events. In 2005, a cycling centre was opened in Yerevan with the aim of helping produce world class Armenian cyclists. The government has also promised a cash reward of $700,000 to Armenians who win a gold medal at the Olympics.

Armenia has also been very successful in chess, winning the World Champion in 2011 and the World Chess Olympiad on three occasions.

Cuisine

Armenian cuisine is closely related to eastern and Mediterranean cuisine; various spices, vegetables, fish, and fruits combine to present unique dishes. The main characteristics of Armenian cuisine are a reliance on the quality of the ingredients rather than heavily spicing food, the use of herbs, the use of wheat in a variety of forms, of legumes, nuts, and fruit (as a main ingredient as well as to sour food), and the stuffing of a wide variety of leaves.

The pomegranate, with its symbolic association with fertility, represents the nation. The apricot is the national fruit.

Media

Television, magazines, and newspapers are all operated by both state-owned and for-profit corporations which depend on advertising, subscription, and other sales-related revenues. The Constitution of Armenia guarantees freedom of speech and Armenia ranks 61st in the 2020 Press Freedom Index report compiled by Reporters Without Borders, between Georgia and Poland. Armenia's press freedom rose considerably following the 2018 Velvet Revolution.

As of 2020, the biggest issue facing press freedom in Armenia is judicial harassment of journalists, specifically defamation suits and attacks on journalists' right to protect sources, as well as excessive responses to combat disinformation spread by social media users. Reporters Without Borders also cites continued concerns about lack of transparency regarding ownership of media outlets.

See also

 Armenians
 History of Armenia
 Index of Armenia-related articles
 List of people on coins of Armenia
 Outline of Armenia

Explanatory notes

Source attribution

Citations

Sources

External links

 Electronic Government of Armenia
 The Armenian Church
 Hayastan All Armenian Fund
 
 Armenia. The World Factbook. Central Intelligence Agency.
 
 Armenia profile from the BBC News
 
 Key Development Forecasts for Armenia from International Futures
 Armeniapedia.org
 Armenia Securities Exchange

 
1918 establishments in Asia
1918 establishments in Europe
1920 disestablishments in Asia
1920 disestablishments in Europe
1991 establishments in Asia
1991 establishments in Europe
Armenian-speaking countries and territories
Caucasus
Christian states
Countries in Asia
Countries in Europe
Member states of the United Nations
Eastern European countries
Landlocked countries
Member states of the Commonwealth of Independent States
Member states of the Council of Europe
Member States of the Eurasian Economic Union
Member States of the Collective Security Treaty Organization
Republics
South Caucasus
States and territories disestablished in 1920
States and territories established in 1918
States and territories established in 1991
Transcontinental countries
Western Asian countries
States with limited recognition